Mike Sundin (born October 11, 1957) is a Minnesota politician and member of the Minnesota House of Representatives. A member of the Minnesota Democratic–Farmer–Labor Party (DFL), he represents District 11A in northeastern Minnesota.

Early career
Sundin served on the Cloquet School Board for five years.

Minnesota House of Representatives
Sundin was first elected to the Minnesota House of Representatives in 2012.

Personal life
Sundin is married to his wife, Terry. They have three children and reside in Esko, Minnesota. He is a consultant.

References

External links

Rep. Mike Sundin official Minnesota House of Representatives website
Rep. Mike Sundin official campaign website

1957 births
Living people
Democratic Party members of the Minnesota House of Representatives
21st-century American politicians